Lublewo is a non-operational PKP railway station on the disused PKP rail line 230 in Lublewo (Pomeranian Voivodeship), Poland, though the station itself lies more than half a kilometre outside the village proper.

Lines crossing the station

References 
Lublewo article at Polish Stations Database, URL accessed at 19 March 2006

Railway stations in Pomeranian Voivodeship
Disused railway stations in Pomeranian Voivodeship
Wejherowo County